Seggelke Klarinetten (GmbH & Co. KG), is a German clarinet manufacturer based in Bamberg in the Bavarian Upper Franconia. The company manufactures clarinets according to the German handle system (Oehler system) and the French system (Boehm system) as well as in a combination of both systems, starting from the Boehm system (so-called modular design). A specialty of the company is the reproduction of historical clarinets.

History 

The company was founded in 1996 as a company by the clarinet maker Werner Schwenk and the clarinet maker and clarinetist Jochen Seggelke, based in Tübingen and Bamberg. In 1998, the two production facilities were merged in Bamberg. In 2002, the company moved there larger premises. The co-shareholder Werner Schwenk retired from the company in 2013, which has since been continued by Jochen Seggelke as a sole proprietorship. In 2020 the company was transferred to the newly founded company Seggelke Klarinetten GmbH & Co. KG. The name Schwenk and Seggelke will be continued as a brand name (label).

Products 

In all of the above three designs, the company offers the full range of clarinet from high A flat to low G, including basset clarinets in A and B and G (!), as well as basset horn in F and bass clarinet in B. All basset and bass clarinets and basset horns extend down to a low C.	

All instruments are individually configurable in terms of equipment (bore, type of wood, mechanical equipment, and their finishing). There are also replicas of 10 historical instruments in different moods, of which two models are offered in B and A. Not in the program: the alto clarinet in E flat (looks similar to a basset horn) and the extremely rare contra alto clarinet.

The manufacturer S & S has developed several improvements of the mechanics and the soundhole drilling for their clarinets. All instruments are made of wood, mainly of grenadilla wood, but also cocobolo, mopane and boxwood are available, the latter, especially for the historical replicas. The instruments are built to order and primarily for professional clarinetists and are in the top price range. In addition, S & S sells clarinets in the low and middle price range produced by the company F. Arthur Uebel, in a revised form in their own workshop.  Since 2014 Jochen Seggelke avised this company in acoustic and technical questions.

Awards 

In March 2006, the newly developed basset horn was awarded the Bavarian State Prize, after S & S already received a design award in 2004. Instead of the usual metal bow between the mouthpiece and the upper joint, the instrument is equipped with a normal barrel and a bent connecting piece between the barrel and the upper joint each made of wood. In 2013, the E flat clarinet model 2000 received the German Musical Instrument Award

Sales areas 

Around one-third of Seggelke Klarinetten products are sold in Germany, the rest in Europe and overseas.

References

External links 

 Website  
 YouTube-Video: The American clarinetist Charles Neidich teaches the Mozart concerto with his Stadler basset clarinet modeled by S & S.
 YouTube-Video: The Israeli clarinetist  Shirley Brill performs on a Boxwood clarinet made by S & S in a modular design.

Clarinet systems
Clarinet makers
Companies based in Bavaria
Companies of Germany